Saint-Hilaire-la-Treille is a commune in the Haute-Vienne department in the Nouvelle-Aquitaine region in west-central France.

Geography
The river Brame flows westward through the commune's southern part.

See also
Communes of the Haute-Vienne department

References

Communes of Haute-Vienne